The Synod of Gangra was held in 340, at Gangra (in modern Turkey). The synod condemned Manichaeans, and their practices. The concluding canons of the synod condemned the Manichaeans for their actions, and declared many of their practices anathematised.

The canons of the synod condemned and anathematised the practices of: 
 the condemnation of marriage
 forbidding the eating of most forms of meat
 urging slaves to flee their masters
 arguing that married priests could not perform valid sacraments
 condemning normal church services and holding their own
 distributing church revenues without the consent of the bishop
 remaining celibate for reasons other than holiness
 reviling married persons and the celebration of Christian love-feasts
 wearing certain types of ascetic clothing "as if this gave him righteousness" and condemning others
 women wearing men's clothing under the pretense of asceticism
 women leaving their husbands
 parents abandoning their children
 children leaving their parents
 women cutting off their hair "from pretended asceticism"
 fasting on a Sunday under the pretense of asceticism
 refusing to honour Christian martyrs

Although merely a local synod, its decisions were later ratified by the Council of Chalcedon, which is of immense importance in the early history of Christianity (see also First seven Ecumenical Councils). Most modern Christian groups, whether Protestant, Roman Catholic, or Eastern Orthodox, accept the Council of Chalcedon's decisions, but some Eastern Christians, including the Oriental Orthodox and the Assyrians, reject it.

References

External links
The Synodal Letter, Canons and Epilogue of the Council of Gangra. The Greek and Latin texts (with dictionary lookup links) at www.earlychurchtexts.com.
The Synodal Letter, Canons and Epilogue of the Council of Gangra. An English translation at www.earlychurchtexts.com.
Council of Gangra at ccel.org

Gangra
340
340s in the Roman Empire
Manichaeism